Ticket to a Crime is a 1934 American mystery film directed by Lewis D. Collins and starring Ralph Graves, Lois Wilson and Lola Lane. A private detective and his assistant solve a murder at a country club.

Cast
 Ralph Graves as Clay Holt 
 Lois Wilson as Elaine Purdy 
 Lola Lane as Peggy Cummings 
 James Burke as Detective Lt. John Aloysius McGinnis 
 Charles Ray as Courtney Mallory 
 Edward Earle as Willis Purdy 
 Hyram A. Hoover as Jerry Papolas 
 John Elliott as Mr. Davidson

References

Bibliography
 Larry Langman & Daniel Finn. A Guide to American Crime Films of the Thirties. Greenwood Press, 1995.

External links
 

1934 films
1930s mystery films
1930s English-language films
American mystery films
Films directed by Lewis D. Collins
American black-and-white films
American action films
1930s action films
American crime films
1930s crime films
1930s American films